Stephen Orgel is Professor of English at Stanford University.  Best known as a scholar of Shakespeare, Orgel writes primarily about the political and historical context of Renaissance literature.

Orgel received his B.A. from Columbia University in 1954 and his Ph.D. from Harvard University in 1959.  He has taught at Stanford since 1985. He is a noted book collector.

Selected critical works
The Illusion of Power. U California P, 1975.
Impersonations:The Performance of Gender in Shakespeare's England. Cambridge, 1996.
The Authentic Shakespeare.  Routledge, 2002.
Imagining Shakespeare. Palgrave, 2003.
John Milton: The Major Works. Edited by Orgel and Jonathan Goldberg.  Oxford, 1991.

References

American literary critics
Shakespearean scholars
Columbia College (New York) alumni
Harvard University alumni
Stanford University Department of English faculty
American academics of English literature
Living people
Year of birth missing (living people)